Live in London is a live album by American thrash metal band Testament, released on CD and DVD on November 1, 2005. It features the original Testament line up of Chuck Billy, Greg Christian, Louie Clemente, Eric Peterson, and Alex Skolnick, although John Tempesta played drums from the beginning of the show up to "Trial by Fire"; he was then replaced by original drummer Clemente for the remainder of the show. This was the third show of the 10 Days in May Tour.  Backstage footage is included from the Innsbruck, Austria date on May 12, 2005, among others. 

The DVD release features three audio mixes as well as a short interview with the band members.

Track listing

Personnel 
Chuck Billy: vocals
Alex Skolnick: lead guitar
Eric Peterson: rhythm/lead guitar
Greg Christian: bass
John Tempesta: drums (tracks 1–8)
Louie Clemente: drums (tracks 9–14)
Andy Sneap: mixing

References 

2005 live albums
Testament (band) live albums
2005 video albums
Live video albums
Testament (band) video albums
Spitfire Records live albums